The January 1958 Tangerine Bowl was an American college football bowl game played following the 1957 season, on January 1, 1958, at the Tangerine Bowl stadium in Orlando, Florida. The game pitted the Mississippi Southern Southerners (today's Southern Miss) and the East Texas State Lions (now Texas A&M University–Commerce). It was the first of two Tangerine Bowls played in calendar year 1958.

Background
The Lions were champions of the Lone Star Conference after finishing 8–1, with only one conference loss in seven tries. This was their third conference title in four seasons along with their fourth Tangerine Bowl appearance in seven seasons. The Southerners, who were an NCAA College Division independent, finished 8–2, while being invited to their second straight Tangerine Bowl and fourth bowl game in five years.

Game summary
Garry Berry scored a touchdown for the Lions on a three-yard touchdown plunge. The Southerners scored back on a touchdown plunge from quarterback George Sekul. A snap that went over the punter for the Lions sailed into the endzone, giving Mississippi Southern a 9–7 lead. With 7:47 to go in the game, Neal Hinson kicked a 31-yard field goal to put the go-ahead points on the board for the Lions, and they held on to win their second Tangerine Bowl in three appearances.

Aftermath
Mississippi Southern's next bowl was be the 1980 Independence Bowl, by which time they were known as the Southern Miss Golden Eagles.

References

Tangerine Bowl
Citrus Bowl (game)
Southern Miss Golden Eagles football bowl games
Texas A&M–Commerce Lions football bowl games
1958 in sports in Florida
Tangerine Bowl